Geoff Achison (born 5 August 1965 in Cowes on Phillip Island in the Gippsland region of Victoria, Australia) is an independent Australian Melbourne-based singer/songwriter guitarist, whose artistic focus is of the blues, blues rock and soul genres. He performs in two modes – as a solo artist performing and singing with acoustic guitar, and bandleader as a singer/electric guitarist.

Career
Achison performed as lead guitarist for Dutch Tilders between 1989–96, before beginning to feature as a solo artist. He appeared in many festivals in Australia, including:

 Echuca Moama Winter Blues 
Australian Blues Music Festival
Port Fairy Folk Festival
 Wangaratta Jazz Festival
 Sydney Blues Festival 2010, 2015
 Bendigo Blues & Roots Music Festival
Bruthen Blues & Arts Festival
 Manly Jazz Festival 1998/99; 
 the Thredbo Blues Festivals of 2011, and 2001, 1995–98 performing as the "Classically Blue" Trio with violinist Adrian Keating and bass player Steve Sampson;  
 the Sydney Festival's 2001 'Jazz in the Domain' performing as 'Classically Blue'.

After performing with Dutch Tilders, Achison formed his band 'the Souldiggers' and produced his first album, Big Machine in 1994. It is featured in the National Library of Australia. By 2002, membership of 'The Souldiggers' included Gerry Pantazis and two ex-members of Little River Band: bassist Roger McLachlan, and keyboardist Mal Logan.

Achison has been an instructor at Fur Peace Ranch guitar camp run by Jorma Kaukonen each year since 1998,

 and has featured in a live performance with the Allman Brothers.

He currently plays a Lichty Guitars
acoustic instrument when performing in the US. In Australia, Achison plays Cole-Clark acoustic guitars.

Awards
In 1995 the Melbourne Blues Appreciation Society sent Achison to the Memphis International Blues Challenge, where he won the Albert King Award  for the most promising guitarist of the finals. He received a Gibson Nighthawk guitar and signed an endorsement contract with Gibson Guitar Corporation following the event.

He was awarded London-based Jazz FM's Album of the Month in 1999, for Mystery Train. Achison, along with the Souldiggers, won 'Group of the Year' at the 2007 Australian Blues Music 'Chain' Awards.

In 2007, Little Big Men won Kweevak Music Magazine's Readers' Choice awards., and in 2008, 'Guitar Player' magazine's readers' poll listed Achison as one of the top 10 Hot New Guitarists.

The Melbourne Blues Appreciation Society has awarded Achison 'Male Artist of the Year', 'Album of the Year', 'Song of the Year' and 'Band of the Year' 2012.

Discography

Awards and nominations

Music Victoria Awards
The Music Victoria Awards is an annual awards ceremony celebrating Victorian music.

|-
| Music Victoria Awards of 2013
| Box of Blues (with Geoff Achison )
| Best Blues Albums
| 
|}

References

External links

Classically Blue

Australian blues guitarists
Australian male guitarists
Australian songwriters
Australian rock guitarists
Lead guitarists
Musicians from Melbourne
Fingerstyle guitarists
1965 births
Living people
Blues rock musicians